Kales is the Dutch name of Calais, France.

Kales may also refer to:
Kales (Bithynia), a town of ancient Bithynia, now in Turkey
Kales (Campania), a town of ancient Campania, Italy
Kales (river), a river of ancient Asia Minor